The Watch may refer to:

 The town watch, a medieval precursor to the modern police
 The Watch (2008 film), a made-for-TV film starring Clea DuVall 
 The Watch (2012 film), a science fiction comedy film starring Ben Stiller
 "The Watch" (Seinfeld), an episode of Seinfeld
 "The Watch" (The Amazing World of Gumball), an Episode of The Amazing World of Gumball
 The Watch (band), an Italian progressive rock band
 The Watch (TV series), 2021 series, inspired by Terry Pratchett's Discworld novels

See also 
 Watch (disambiguation)